Robina is an Australian historical novel by E. V. Timms. It was the tenth in his Great South Land Saga of novels.

Background
The novel is set around the settlement of South Australia.

References

External links
Robina at AustLit

1958 Australian novels
Novels set in South Australia
Angus & Robertson books